The Casements is a mansion in Ormond Beach, Florida, U.S., famous for being the winter residence of American oil magnate John D. Rockefeller. It is currently owned by the city of Ormond Beach and is used as a cultural center and park. It is located on a barrier island within the city limits, overlooking the Halifax River, which is now part of the Florida Intracoastal Waterway.

History
The mansion was built in 1913 for the Reverend Dr. Harwood Huntington of New Haven, Connecticut. It was named for the many casement windows incorporated into the design of the building, which helped keep the interior cool in spite of Florida's subtropical climate.

The Rockefeller era
Its most famous resident, John D. Rockefeller, purchased the home as his winter residence in 1918.  Rockefeller was seventy-eight years old when he moved into the Casements.  He became known in the area for his elaborate Christmas parties, his love of golf, and for handing out dimes to his neighbors or visitors.  During a golf game with Harvey Firestone, the tire magnate made such a good shot that Rockefeller decided he deserved a dime and handed one to his somewhat embarrassed guest.

Over the years, Edward VIII, Henry Ford, and Will Rogers visited Rockefeller at The Casements; Rogers once quipped, "I’m glad you won (at golf) today, Mr. Rockefeller. The last time you lost, the price of gasoline went up!"

Guests at The Casements received a poem along with their new dime.  This poem is believed to have been written by Rockefeller:

It was in this home that Rockefeller eventually died in his sleep on the morning of May 23, 1937.  The Rockefeller family sold The Casements in 1939.

Later history

Over the next 20 years, The Casements served as a girls' preparatory school and a home for the elderly. In 1959 the property was purchased by the Hotel Ormond Corporation with plans for development, but those plans never materialized. In 1973, The Casements was placed on the National Register of Historic Places. The next year, it was purchased for $500,000 by the City of Ormond Beach, which eventually restored it until October 1979 to serve as a cultural and community center.

In 2009 The Casements underwent a $1.1 million renovation project.

The gardens

The Casements gardens are an authentic restoration of a two-acre garden along the Halifax riverfront that belonged to John D. Rockefeller Sr. in the early 1900s. The gardens feature citrus trees, a grand promenade, streams and small bridges and a variety of seasonal flower displays during the year.

Gallery

References

External links 

 Volusia County listings at Florida's Office of Cultural and Historical Programs
 The Casements
 Ormond Beach Historical Trust
 The Casements - Cultural activities

Rockefeller family residences
Houses on the National Register of Historic Places in Volusia County, Florida
Shingle Style houses
Ormond Beach, Florida
Shingle Style architecture in Florida
Gilded Age mansions